Season fourteen of Dancing with the Stars premiered on March 19, 2012, on the ABC network.

Starting the week of April 16, and for the next two weeks after that, the bottom two couples competed in a dance duel. Both couples performed at the same time, at which point the judges decided who would be eliminated that week.

Green Bay Packers wide receiver Donald Driver and Peta Murgatroyd won the competition over British classical singer Katherine Jenkins and Mark Ballas, who finished second, and Cuban-American Telenovela star William Levy and Cheryl Burke, who finished third.

This season introduced "Ballroom Battles" where Cheryl Burke, Mark Ballas, Louis van Amstel, Lacey Schwimmer, Karina Smirnoff, and Tony Dovolani trained a pair of amateur dancers to compete against other amateur couples. The teams of Burke, Dovolani, and van Amstel competed in the final stage by performing a jive. Burke's team were named the champions by the judges with Dovolani's and van Amstel's teams taking second and third places respectively.

Cast

Couples
The twelve celebrities and professional dancers who competed are listed below. Two new professionals were added into the dance troupe: Henry Byalikov and Emma Slater. They joined Sharna Burgess, Kiki Nyemchek, Oksana Dmytrenko, and Sasha Farber.

Host and judges
Tom Bergeron and Brooke Burke Charvet returned as co-hosts, while Carrie Ann Inaba, Len Goodman, and Bruno Tonioli returned as judges. The Harold Wheeler orchestra and singers provided the music throughout the season.

Scoring charts

Notes

 : This was the lowest score of the week.
 : This was the highest score of the week.
 :  This couple finished in first place.
 :  This couple finished in second place.
 :  This couple finished in third place.
 :  This couple was in the bottom two, but was not eliminated.
 :  This couple was eliminated.

Highest and lowest scoring performances 
The highest and lowest performances in each dance according to the judges' 30-point scale are as follows.

Couples' highest and lowest scoring dances
Scores are based upon a potential 30-point maximum.

Weekly scores
Individual judges' scores in the charts below (given in parentheses) are listed in this order from left to right: Carrie Ann Inaba, Len Goodman, Bruno Tonioli.

Week 1: First Dances
Couples are listed in the order they performed.

Week 2: First Elimination
Couples are listed in the order they performed.

Week 3: Most Memorable Year Week
Couples are listed in the order they performed.

Week 4: Rock Week
Couples are listed in the order they performed.

Week 5: Latin Week
Couples are listed in the order they performed.

Judges' votes to save
Inaba: Jaleel & Kym
Goodman: Jaleel & Kym
Tonioli: Jaleel & Kym

Week 6: Motown Week
Couples are listed in the order they performed.

Judges' votes to save
Inaba: Gladys & Tristan
Goodman: Roshon & Chelsie
Tonioli: Roshon & Chelsie

Week 7: Classical Week
Couples are listed in the order they performed.

Judges' votes to rescue
Inaba: Roshon & Chelsie
Goodman: Roshon & Chelsie
Tonioli: Roshon & Chelsie

Week 8: Trio Week
All six couples chose one professional who was either previously eliminated or participated in the dance troupe to perform with them in their Latin routine. Two couples were eliminated at the end of the night. Couples are listed in the order they performed.

Week 9: Semifinals
Couples are listed in the order they performed.

Week 10: Finals
Couples are listed in the order they performed.

Night 1

Night 2

Dance chart
The celebrities and professional partners danced one of these routines for each corresponding week:
 Week 1 (First Dances): One unlearned dance (cha-cha-cha or foxtrot)
 Week 2 (First Elimination): One unlearned dance  (jive or quickstep)
 Week 3 (Most Memorable Year Week): One unlearned dance 
 Week 4 (Rock Week): One unlearned dance 
 Week 5 (Latin Week): One unlearned dance
 Week 6 (Motown Week): One unlearned dance & Motown marathon 
 Week 7 (Classical Week): One unlearned dance & team dances 
 Week 8 (Trio Week): Two unlearned dances 
 Week 9 (Semifinals): Two unlearned dances 
 Week 10 (Finals, Night 1): Judge's choice dance & freestyle
 Week 10 (Finals, Night 2): 24-hour challenge

Notes

 :  This was the highest scoring dance of the week.
 :  This was the lowest scoring dance of the week.
 :  This couple danced, but received no scores.

Ratings

References

External links

Dancing with the Stars (American TV series)
2012 American television seasons